Matías Miranda (born 5 May 2000) is an Argentine professional footballer who plays as a left midfielder for Gimnasia y Esgrima.

Club career
Miranda is a product of the Gimnasia y Esgrima youth system, having joined in 2006. He made the step into senior football in 2019–20, with Diego Maradona selecting him as a substitute for a Primera División fixture with River Plate on 28 September. Maradona subsequently subbed the midfielder on after fifty-six minutes, as he replaced Horacio Tijanovich in the two-goal home defeat.

International career
In November 2016, Miranda was called up by Miguel Mico to train with the Argentina U17s.

Career statistics
.

References

External links

2000 births
Living people
Footballers from La Plata
Argentine footballers
Association football midfielders
Argentine Primera División players
Club de Gimnasia y Esgrima La Plata footballers